Formin-binding protein 1-like is a protein that in humans is encoded by the FNBP1L gene.

Function 

The protein encoded by this gene binds to both CDC42 and N-WASP. This protein promotes CDC42-induced actin polymerization by activating the N-WASP-WIP complex and, therefore, is involved in a pathway that links cell surface signals to the actin cytoskeleton. Alternative splicing results in multiple transcript variants encoding different isoforms.

Clinical significance 

FNBP1L polymorphisms, specifically the SNP rs236330 has been associated with normally varying intelligence differences in adults and in children.

References

Further reading